St Helens is a rural locality in the Toowoomba Region, Queensland, Australia. In the  St Helens had a population of 22 people.

History 
The name of the locality probably derives from an early pastoral station of N. Gillies.

In the  St Helens had a population of 22 people.

References 

Toowoomba Region
Localities in Queensland